Yevhen Ihorovych Cheberko (born 23 January 1998) is a Ukrainian professional footballer who plays as a centre-back for Osijek.

Club career
Cheberko is a product of the UFK Dnipropetrovsk and FC Dnipo (first trainer was Ihor Khomenko) Youth Sportive School Systems.

He made his debut as a substituted player in a second half-time for FC Dnipro in the match against FC Volyn Lutsk on 24 July 2016 in the Ukrainian Premier League.

On 5 February 2021, Cheberko joined Croatian First Football League side Osijek on an 18-month loan deal.

International career
He made his national team debut on 7 October 2020 in a friendly against France.

Career statistics

Club

References

External links

1998 births
Living people
People from Melitopol
Ukrainian footballers
Ukraine international footballers
Ukraine under-21 international footballers
Ukraine youth international footballers
Association football midfielders
FC Dnipro players
FC Zorya Luhansk players
LASK players
NK Osijek players
Ukrainian Premier League players
Austrian Football Bundesliga players
Croatian Football League players
Ukrainian expatriate footballers
Expatriate footballers in Austria
Ukrainian expatriate sportspeople in Austria
Expatriate footballers in Croatia
Ukrainian expatriate sportspeople in Croatia
Sportspeople from Zaporizhzhia Oblast